Birpur is a village in vaishali district, Bihar which is situated at the river island called Raghopur Diyara Island. It is one of the largest village in Raghopur community block. People of this village are mostly dependent on agriculture. People in this area has long tradition of joining armed forces. Its population is approximately 20,000 (Twenty Thousand) and peoples of this village are living their life in peaceful manner. Birpur is named upon Raja Bir Singh, a  migrant from Jodhpur in the 17th century. Most of the Villagers work outside and bring revenue to this place which helps flourish the local community and enhance purchasing power.  Birpur comes under Raghopur community block and a police station is Jurawanpur. It is the second largest village in the Raghopur block in terms of area and population. its pin code is 844508. literacy rate of this village is very low around 33%. Higher education facility is not available in the village and also there is no any good hospitals, only small private clinic exists here, which is operated by non-professional or we can call it as a jhola chhap doctor means one who doesn't have any degree. Bajjika is the only language which people speaks. It is spread over in the area of 20 km.

Geography and nearby cities
Birpur Village is  mainly consisting of two major area known as Birpur Purvi (Birpur East) and  Birpur Paschimi (Birpur West). This two area consist several small tolas ( Blocks or Wards). Birpur is surrounded by Rupas Mahaji in East, Shiv Nagar in West, Kala Diyara in South and by River Gnaga in North. The Land in north near river Ganga is main agricultural land. Hajipur is the headquarter of this area and the local Registrar sits in the Mahnar. It is Part of Raghopur community Development block. Every year village is getting affected due to flood by Ganga river and it cannot be stopped due to its proximity with river. Since this whole area has surrounded by the river ganga so every year this area gets affected due to flood. After 70 year's of Independence, the village has been recently electrified in 2017. Availability of Electricity has brought significant development in the villager's life style.

Near By Cities
Khushropur
Bakhtiyarpur
Fatuha
Mehnar
Hajipur
Patna

Schools

 Govt. middle school, Fenuabad, Birpur
 Govt. middle school, Sengar Tola, Birpur
 Harijan middle school, Birpur Purbi
 Govt. High school, Birpur
 Shishu gyan shala, Birpur, Raghopur, Vaishali

Temples

 Mahavireshwar Nath Mandir, Uparki, Birpur

 Maa Kaali mandir, Birpur east
 Maa Kaali Mandir, Birpur Badka Tola
 Mahavir Mandir, Birpur Badka Tola 
 Janakeshwar nath mandir, Birpur east
 Maa durga mandir, Birpur north
 Maa Durga mandir, Birpur east
 Shiv mandir, Uparki Tola, Birpur

Hospitals
There are currently no hospitals in Birpur village. For better treatment people of this village used to go to the nearest cities like Bakhtiyarpur, Khushropur, Fatuha and Patna.

 APHC, Birpur (non-operational)

Transportation
Birpur is connected to Patna by Pipa Pool, Kachidargah and Pipa Pool, Gyaspur.  When  floating bridge( pipa pul) is not operational, people use boat or strimmer to cross the river because Pipa Pool is a seasonal floating bridge which operates from January to August or September due to an increase in the water of Ganga river, bridge gets removed. Local Van  keeps plying in the village for Gayashpur or Kachidragh in day time from 7'0 clock to 5'o clock evening. Due to less public vehicle people use their own motorbike and car for transportation.

Nearby railway stations
 Karauta
 Bakhtiyarpur
 Khushropur
 Fatuha

Market
Groceries and household items are available in the shop located in every corner of village. There is regular evening market on twice a week is getting organised from many decades at Uparki Durga Temple, where you will find some permanent shops also.  This is a small market in this village where vegetables, fruits, fish, meat, chicken and other groceries are being sold by framers and traders also.  People used to go to Bakhtiyarpur, Kachidargah, Hajipur, Mahanar and  Patna for bigger marketing purchase.

References

Villages in Vaishali district